Kissell is a surname. Notable people with the surname include:

 George Kissell (1920–2008), American baseball player and coach
 John Kissell (1923–1992), American football defensive tackle
 Larry Kissell (born 1951), U.S. Representative for North Carolina

See also
 Kissel (disambiguation)